Joseph Peter Saladino, known professionally as Joey Salads is an American YouTube personality and prankster from New York City. His eponymous main channel, and second channel Just Viral TV have a total of 557,066,992 video views and 10.090000 million subscribers combined.

Personal life 

Saladino grew up in Prince's Bay, Staten Island, New York City. His former boss, the manager of a local pizzeria, has stated that Saladino "tweaked operations" to force the restaurant to run more efficiently.

Saladino attended St. Joseph by-the-Sea High School. He then attended classes at the College of Staten Island, but claims to have "learned nothing" there and dropped out to pursue his YouTube career. He was removed from social media platform Twitter in May 2020. A spokesperson from Twitter stated, "the account was permanently suspended for repeated violations of our platform manipulation and spam policy".

Career

YouTube 

Saladino registered the Joey Salads YouTube account in 2012, and uploaded roughly one video per week. Many of his early videos were Jackass-style pranks, though his content became more political following Donald Trump's bid for President in 2016. He has described his videos as "edgy" and "dumb pranks" made to entertain.

Saladino has admitted to staging pranks on more than one occasion. He has been criticized for faking his prank and social experiment videos, as well as for promoting a narrative that portrays African Americans as violent. In his video "Black people don't like Trump", published in 2016, Saladino leaves a car with Donald Trump campaign stickers in a mostly African American neighborhood. Then several African Americans appear, break into the car, and break its windows. After receiving backlash from critics including h3h3Productions for misportraying black Americans, Saladino admitted the video was staged with actors.

One prank that did not appear to be staged resulted in Saladino urinating in his own mouth.  The video has since been deleted but images remain available.

Congressional campaign 

In 2019, Saladino began campaigning for the Republican primary in New York's 11th congressional district, which encompasses Staten Island and a small section of Brooklyn. His campaign raised a total of $66,704.22 during this time. Saladino withdrew his candidacy on December 13, 2019, and stated his endorsement for fellow Republican candidate Joe Caldarera. He has been accused of running to boost his public profile.

Saladino was incorrectly identified as attending the "Unite the Right" protest at Charlottesville after a photo of him wearing a swastika armband began circulating on Twitter. Saladino was in Jamaica during the event, with Saladino claiming the image was taken from a prank video he had uploaded to YouTube months beforehand.

He filed a formal complaint against congresswoman Alexandria Ocasio-Cortez in response to the congresswoman blocking him on Twitter, citing a ruling that prevents elected officials from censoring speech on public forums.

References 

American YouTubers
Living people
New York (state) Republicans
People from Prince's Bay, Staten Island
1993 births
Prank YouTubers